UCHC may refer to:
 University of Connecticut Health Center
 United Collegiate Hockey Conference